Roger Karoutchi (born 26 August 1951) is a French teacher and politician who has been serving as the first Vice President of the Senate since 2020. He previously served as the French Ambassador to the OECD and as Secretary of State to the French Prime Minister, with responsibility for Relations with Parliament.

Early life
Karoutchi was born in Casablanca into a Moroccan Jewish family. His ancestors were Livornese Jews (Grana) from Italy who had settled in Morocco in the 18th century.

He received a master's degree from the Sciences Po Aix.

Career
Karoutchi became a history teacher, first in Goussainville, and then in Paris, teaching from 1975 to 1985. He continued his political activity, which he had started at the age of 16, during that period, being a national delegate of the Rassemblement pour la République (RPR) from 1981 to 1986.

At that time, Karoutchi joined the office of Philippe Séguin, the Minister of Social Affairs and Employment, eventually becoming Séguin's chief of staff when he became president of the National Assembly.

Karoutchi was a Member of the European Parliament from 1997 to 1999 and Senator from Hauts-de-Seine from 1999 to 2007.

Karoutchi was very active in the 2007 presidential campaign of Nicolas Sarkozy, with whom he has a close personal relationship.

From 2009 to 2011, Karoutchi served as the French Ambassador to the OECD.

As part of a reorganization of the Union for a Popular Movement (later Republicans) leadership under their chairman Jean-François Copé in January 2013, Karoutchi became – alongside Henri de Raincourt, Jean-Claude Gaudin, Brice Hortefeux, Christian Estrosi and Gérard Longuet – one of the party’s six vice-presidents.

Political positions
In the 2012 leadership election of the Union for a Popular Movement (UMP), Karoutchi endorsed Jean-François Copé.

In the Republicans' 2016 presidential primaries, Karoutchi endorsed Sarkozy as the party's candidate for the office of President of France. Ahead of the 2022 presidential elections, he publicly declared his support for Valérie Pécresse as the Republicans’ candidate.

Political career 
Karoutchi has held various governmental and electoral positions throughout his career. He served as the Secretary of State for Relations with Parliament from 2007 to 2009. Prior to this, he was a member of the European Parliament from 1997 to 1999, and then became a senator of Hauts-de-Seine until 2007 when he joined the government.

Karoutchi has also served as a Vice-president of the Regional Council of Ile-de-France from 1994 to 1998, and as a Regional councillor of Ile-de-France since 1992, being reelected in 1998 and 2004. He has also held various municipal council positions, including deputy-mayor of Villeneuve-la-Garenne since 2008, municipal councillor of Villeneuve-la-Garenne since 2008, municipal councillor of Nanterre from 1989 to 1995, and municipal councillor of Boulogne-Billancourt from 1995 to 2001.

Personal life
In January 2009, Karoutchi publicly announced that he is gay, becoming the first French minister to come out while in office.

References

Biography
Official website

1951 births
Living people
French people of Italian-Jewish descent
People from Casablanca
20th-century Moroccan Jews
Moroccan emigrants to France
Jewish French politicians
Union of Democrats for the Republic politicians
Rally for the Republic politicians
Union for a Popular Movement politicians
The Republicans (France) politicians
Government ministers of France
Gaullism, a way forward for France
French Senators of the Fifth Republic
MEPs for France 1994–1999
MEPs for France 1999–2004
LGBT Jews
LGBT conservatism
Gay politicians
Moroccan LGBT people
OECD officials
Sciences Po Aix alumni
LGBT MEPs for France
Senators of Hauts-de-Seine